is a near-Earth object roughly  in diameter discovered by Grzegorz Duszanowicz and Jordi Camarasa. The object orbits the Sun but makes slow close approaches to the Earth–Moon system. Between 11 June 2022 and 3 July 2022 (a period of ) it passed within Earth's Hill sphere (roughly ) at a low relative velocity and became temporarily captured by Earth's gravity, with a geocentric orbital eccentricity of less than 1 and negative geocentric orbital energy. Due to its Earth-like orbit, the object might be of artificial origin or lunar ejecta. However, visible spectroscopy obtained with the Gran Telescopio Canarias shows that it is an asteroid. It will return as a mini-moon in December 2051. 

The object was discovered on 2 July 2022 by Moonbase South Observatory in Namibia when it had a deep Southern Hemisphere declination of –59° in the constellation of Pavo.

With a 56-day observation arc the object shows a 1.2% chance of impacting Earth between the years of 2075–2122. This asteroid experienced a temporarily-captured flyby in 1981, had another one in 2022, and the current observation arc predicts it will become a mini-moon again in 2051.

The reflectance spectrum of 2022 NX1 suggests that its origin is not artificial and also that it is not lunar ejecta; it is also different from the V type of the only other mini-moon with available spectroscopy, . The visible spectrum of 2022 NX1 is consistent with that of a K-type asteroid, although it could also be classified as an Xk type. Considering typical values of the similar albedo of both K-type and Xk-type asteroids and its absolute magnitude, 2022 NX1 may have a size range of 5 to 15 m.

See also 
  near-Earth asteroid temporarily captured by Earth after its discovery in 1991
  the first temporary Earth satellite discovered in situ 2006
  another temporary Earth satellite discovered in 2020
 2020 SO a suspected near-Earth object identified as a rocket booster from the Surveyor 2 mission

References

External links 
 It came from below. Newly-discovered 2022 NX1 briefly entered Earth's orbit (ecc < 1) through the L1 point. (Tony Dunn 17 July 2022)

Minor planet object articles (unnumbered)

20220626
20220702
Potential impact events caused by near-Earth objects